J. David Arnold is an American academic who is president and professor of psychology at Eureka College in Eureka, Illinois.  

Arnold has been vice president for academic and student affairs at Missouri Western State College, St. Joseph, Missouri. He also served as vice president for academic affairs and provost at Salve Regina University. In addition he has served as provost at St. John Fisher College and as a dean and grants officer at Clarion University. He started his academic career teaching psychology and writing at St. Lawrence University, a residential liberal arts college where he was tenured and promoted before becoming an associate dean.

Personal and educational 
A native of Lancaster, Pennsylvania, and the first in his family to graduate from college, Arnold completed his undergraduate degree with honors at Bloomsburg University (formerly Bloomsburg State College), graduate work at the University of New Hampshire, and summer post-doctoral study at the Institute for Educational Management at Harvard University. Arnold and his wife Katherine have three children.

References

External links 
 Eureka College website President's greeting

Year of birth missing (living people)
Living people
Eureka College
People from Lancaster, Pennsylvania
Bloomsburg University of Pennsylvania alumni
St. Lawrence University faculty
University of New Hampshire alumni
Missouri Western State University faculty
St. John Fisher College